Schmitten Discgolf Parcours is a seasonal 18-hole disc golf course located in Zell am See, Austria. The course is set on a ski slope and progresses downhill. Established on 15 June 2009, it was the first disc golf course in Austria and the 3,000th course to be added to the PDGA Course Directory. It is open for free to players who purchased a valid cable car ticket.

Course details 
Most holes on Schmitten Discgolf Parcours are set on an open field, except hole 9. The course sports cyan tee pads made out of rubber and twenty Discmania DISCatcher baskets. There is a practice basket before hole 1 and a second one after hole 18. The course layout has been redesigned since its inception and a new map was published in 2018.

Tournaments 
Schmitten Discgolf Parcours hosts the yearly PDGA-sanctioned Schmitten Open tournament since 2010.

See also 

 List of disc golf courses in Austria

References

External links 
 
 Course map
 DG Course Review profile
 PDGA Course Directory profile
 Course walkthrough video 

Disc golf courses in Austria